Buena Vista is may refer to several places in the state of Ohio:

 Buena Vista, Fayette County, Ohio
 Buena Vista, Hocking County, Ohio
 Buena Vista, Scioto County, Ohio